Fort Leavenworth USD 207 is a public unified school district headquartered in Fort Leavenworth, Kansas, United States.

Administration
The school district is currently under the administration of Superintendent Keith Mispagel.

Board of Education
The Board of Education is currently under the leadership of Myron Griswold.

Schools
The school district operates the following schools:
 Patton Jr. High School (7–9)
 Bradley Elementary School (K-6)
 Eisenhower Elementary School (K–6)
 MacArthur Elementary School (K–6)

See also
 Leavenworth USD 453
 List of high schools in Kansas
 List of unified school districts in Kansas
 Kansas State Department of Education
 Kansas State High School Activities Association

References

External links
 

Education in Leavenworth County, Kansas
School districts in Kansas
1901 establishments in Kansas
School districts established in 1901